The Herbig-Haro objects HH 1/2 are the first such objects to be recognized as Herbig-Haro objects and were discovered by George Herbig and Guillermo Haro. They are located at a distance of about 1500 light-years (460 parsec) in the constellation Orion near NGC 1999. HH 1/2 are among the brightest Herbig-Haro objects in the sky and consist of a pair of oppositely oriented bow shocks, separated by 2.5 arcminutes (a projected separation of about 1.1 light year). The HH 1/2 pair were the first Herbig-Haro objects with detected proper motion and HH 2 was the first Herbig-Haro object to be detected in x-rays. Some of the structures in the Herbig-Haro Objects move with a speed of 400 km/s.

The central region 
The central region contains an opaque cloud core with an astrophysical jet and a highly embedded multiple-star system that remains invisible below 3 Microns. These sources were first detected with the Very Large Array and are therefore named VLA 1 and 2. The source HH 1-2 VLA 1 drives the HH 1/2 pair and the source VLA 2 drives the Herbig-Haro objects HH 144/145. There might be even a third outflow in the central region of HH 1/2, indicating a third member.

The jet towards HH 1 is visible in optical images, but the counterjet towards HH 2 was detected in the infrared with the Spitzer Space Telescope.

Gallery

References 

Herbig–Haro objects
Orion (constellation)
Orion molecular cloud complex